is an action shoot 'em up 3D video game developed by Edelweiss and published by Playism for Microsoft Windows in May 2014, for PlayStation 4 in March 2015, and for the Nintendo Switch in November 2018.

Gameplay 

Astebreed is an action shoot 'em up game. The player controls a mech with several attack options being that of a blade attack, a blade dash attack, a spread shot of 'bullets', two different lock-on functions, and a special "ex-attack". The various attacks are also the means by which the player defends either by canceling out enemy projectiles using the main gun or sword, or by using the sword dash attack to dodge.

Reception 

Astebreed received positive reception from critics since its release.

See also 
 Sakuna: Of Rice and Ruin - an action role-playing and simulation game developed by Edelweiss.

Notes

References

External links 

 
 Astebreed at Playism

2014 video games
Action video games
PlayStation 4 games
Video games about mecha
Nintendo Switch games
Shoot 'em ups
Video games developed in Japan
Windows games
Playism games